Belal Halbouni (born December 29, 1999) is a professional footballer who plays as a defender for 2. Bundesliga club 1. FC Magdeburg. Born in Canada, he plays for the Syria national team.

Early life
Halbouni began playing football at age four, joining North London SC at age eight.

University career
In 2018, he attended the University of Western Ontario, where he played for the men's soccer team. He scored his first goal on September 29 against the Algoma Thunderbirds. After one season, he decided to leave school to pursue professional soccer.

Club career 
From 2017 to 2019, he played with FC London in League1 Ontario. He scored his first goal on October 6, 2017 against ProStars FC. In 2019, he was converted from an attacker to centre-back.

In January 2020, he signed a contract with Werder Bremen II of the Regionalliga Nord, the reserve side of Bundesliga club Werder Bremen. He made his debut on February 21, 2020 against HSC Hannover. In June 2021, he extended his contract with the side. During the 2021-22 season, he began serving as the captain of the reserve side. While with the club, he also trained with the first team. In January 2022, Major League Soccer club Vancouver Whitecaps FC had been interested in signing him on a loan deal, however, that deal failed to materialize as the two clubs could not agree on terms. In total, he made 28 appearances for Werder II, scoring three goals and adding two assists. His contract expired after the 2021–22 season and he chose to depart the club, despite an offer to join the first team, as Werder wanted to send him out on loan.

On June 1, 2022, Halbouni signed with newly promoted 2. Bundesliga club 1. FC Magdeburg on a three year contract. He started the season with the second team in the sixth tier Verbandsliga Sachsen-Anhalt, making his debut on August 19 against MSC Preussen.

International career
Halbouni is eligible to represent Canada, Lebanon (where his mother was born), and Syria (where his father was born) internationally.

In January 2021, Halbouni received his first Canada national team call-up for a camp in Florida.

In September 2022, Halbouni accepted a call-up with Syria for two friendlies at the 2022 Jordan International Tournament. He made his debut as a substitute in a 2–0 loss against Jordan on 23 September 2022, but tore his ACL during the match.

Career statistics

References

External links

Belal Halbouni at FuPa

Living people
1999 births
Association football defenders
Syrian footballers
Syria international footballers
Canadian soccer players
Syrian people of Lebanese descent
Canadian people of Syrian descent
Canadian people of Lebanese descent
League1 Ontario players
Regionalliga players
FC London players
SV Werder Bremen II players
1. FC Magdeburg players
Syrian expatriate footballers
Canadian expatriate soccer players
Canadian expatriate sportspeople in Germany
Expatriate footballers in Germany